Tindouf, also written Tinduf, is the westernmost province of Algeria, having a population of 58,193 as of the 2008 census (not including the Sahrawi refugees at the Sahrawi refugee camps). Its population in reality could be as high as 160,000 because of the Sahrawi refugee camps.  Despite the barren landscape, Tindouf is a resource-rich province, with important quantities of iron ore located in the Gara Djebilet area close to the border with Mauritania. Prior to Algerian independence, the area served as a strongpoint of several tribes of the nomadic Reguibat confederation.

History

During the Zayyanid period, the Draa region which surrounds the Tindouf province was governed by a sheikh of the Zayyanids.

The town of Tindouf was rebuilt near an isolated Saharan oasis in 1852 by members of the Tajakant tribe, but sacked and destroyed by the Reguibat tribe in 1895. It remained deserted until French troops led by colonel Trinquet arrived in the area in 1934 and attached the region to the French Algeria territory.

The province houses army and airforce bases for the Algerian military, and is strategically important due to its proximity to the Moroccan border, and its location at a four-country border crossing. From independence in 1956, the Kingdom of Morocco claimed the Tindouf area and western Algeria as part of Morocco. These claims are based on the allegations that until 1952, Tindouf was part of French Morocco and was administratively attached to Agadir, and promises made by parts of the Algerian underground during that country's war for independence. After Algeria's independence in 1962, Morocco's claim to Tindouf was not accepted by the new Algerian republic. This led to the 1963 Sand war, fought along the Moroccan-Algerian border in the Tindouf region, and also involving Béchar Province and Tlemcen Province, after Morocco claimed the area as its own following Algerian independence.

In a process beginning in 1969 and finalized during the OAU summit in Rabat in 1972, Morocco recognized the border with Algeria, in exchange for joint exploitation of the iron ore in Tindouf. However, parts of Moroccan society and some nationalist political parties still refer to the Tindouf area as historically Moroccan territory, and the Moroccan parliament has still not ratified the border recognition.

From 1974, refugees from the contested Spanish Sahara started arriving to the Tindouf area, following an earlier wave from the 1958 unrest. This turned into a major exodus from 1975 onwards, when Morocco and Mauritania seized control of what was then called Western Sahara, and Algeria retaliated by allowing the Polisario Front, a nationalist Sahrawi movement, to use the area as its main base. Sahrawi refugee camps were established in 1975-6 here. The Polisario remains in the province, running the large refugee camps located south of Tindouf city.

The European Commission refers to the Sahrawi refugees as the "forgotten refugees".

The province was created from Béchar Province in 1984.

Administrative divisions

The province contains one daïra (district), Tindouf, which is coextensive with the province. The province and daïra has a population of 58,193 inhabitants. The daira is further divided into two communes or municipalities: Tindouf and Oum El Assel. It is one of only 3 provinces in the country which has only one daïra and along with Bordj Baji Mokhtar Province, Djanet Province, In Guezzam Province also has the fewest communes with just 2.

See also

Greater Morocco
Sahrawi refugee camps

References

External links

 
Provinces of Algeria
 States and territories established in 1984